Sandro Obranović (born 18 October 1992) is a Croatian handball player for RK Zagreb and the Croatian national team.

References

1992 births
Living people
Sportspeople from Karlovac
Croatian male handball players
RK Zagreb players